The Rural Municipality of Meeting Lake No. 466 is a rural municipality (RM) in the Canadian province of Saskatchewan within Census Division No. 16 and  Division No. 6.

History 
The RM of Meeting Lake No. 466 incorporated as a rural municipality on January 1, 1913.

Geography

Communities and localities 
The following unincorporated communities are within in the RM.

Organized hamlets
 Mayfair
 Mullingar

Localities
 Crescent Beach
 Green Canyon
 Lorenzo
 Meeting Lake
 Oscar Lake
 Ravenhead
 Sand Beach
 Shady Bay

Demographics 

Government 
The RM of Meeting Lake No. 466 is governed by an elected municipal council and an appointed administrator that meets on the second Thursday of every month. The reeve of the RM is Randy Aumack while its administrator is Janelle Lavallee. The RM's office is located in Mayfair.

Transportation 
 Saskatchewan Highway 324
 Saskatchewan Highway 376
 Saskatchewan Highway 686

See also 
List of rural municipalities in Saskatchewan

References 

M

Division No. 16, Saskatchewan